Bulgaria participated at the 2010 Winter Olympics in Vancouver, British Columbia, Canada. The Bulgarian team consisted of 19 athletes in 6 sports.

Alpine skiing

Bulgaria qualified three alpine skiers.

Men

Women

Biathlon

Bulgaria qualified six biathletes (five male and one female).

Men

Women

Cross-country skiing

Men

Women

Luge

Short track speed skating

Men

Women

Snowboarding

Parallel GS

Snowboard cross

See also
 Bulgaria at the 2010 Winter Paralympics

References

2010 in Bulgarian sport
Nations at the 2010 Winter Olympics
2010